Armando Mook, also Armando Moock Bousquet (1894 in Santiago to 1942 in Buenos Aires) was a Chilean writer and playwright. He wrote the play Arm in Arm Down the Street, which was adapted into films in 1956 and 1966. Other works include Los demonios (1917) and La Serpiente (1919). La Serpiente (also La Serpierde; "The Serpent") is considered his best work. He was a contemporary of Germán Luco Cruchaga.

References

Chilean male dramatists and playwrights
1894 births
1942 deaths
20th-century Chilean dramatists and playwrights
20th-century Chilean male writers